Xavier Lleonart Blanco (born 22 June 1990) is a Spanish field hockey player who plays as a forward for Real Club de Polo and the Spanish national team.

Club career
Lleonart came through the youth ranks of CD Terrassa where he played in the first team until the 2011–12 season. He joined Real Club de Polo after the 2012 Summer Olympics. In 2017 he joined Dutch club Bloemendaal. He won the 2017–18 Euro Hockey League with Bloemendaal before returning to Real Club de Polo after one season.

International career
At the 2012 and 2016 Summer Olympics, Lleonart competed for the national team in the men's tournament. He represented Spain at the 2018 World Cup. At the 2019 EuroHockey Championship, he won his first medal with the national team as they finished second. On 25 May 2021, he was selected in the squad for the 2021 EuroHockey Championship.

References

External links

1990 births
Living people
Sportspeople from Terrassa
Spanish male field hockey players
Male field hockey forwards
2010 Men's Hockey World Cup players
Field hockey players at the 2012 Summer Olympics
2014 Men's Hockey World Cup players
Field hockey players at the 2016 Summer Olympics
Field hockey players at the 2020 Summer Olympics
2018 Men's Hockey World Cup players
Olympic field hockey players of Spain
Real Club de Polo de Barcelona players
HC Bloemendaal players
División de Honor de Hockey Hierba players
Men's Hoofdklasse Hockey players
Expatriate field hockey players
Spanish expatriate sportspeople in the Netherlands